The Copa Higher Power (Spanish for "Cup of Higher Power") is an annual tournament promoted by the Mexican lucha libre professional wrestling promotion International Wrestling Revolution Group (IWRG). The tournament has been annual since September 1997.

Tournament
The tournament is featured in two different forms, as a singles tournament and as a tag team tournament. It was featured as a team tournament in 1997 and in 2003 it began as a singles tournament.

Copa Higher Power Tournament winners

References

International Wrestling Revolution Group tournaments